The 2002 Cambridge City Council election took place on 2 May 2002 to elect members of Cambridge City Council in England. This was on the same day as other nationwide local elections.

Results summary

Ward results

Abbey

Arbury

Castle

Cherry Hinton

Coleridge

East Chesterton

Kings Hedges

Market

Newnham

Petersfield

Queen Edith's

Romsey

Trumpington

West Chesterton

References

Cambridge
2002
2000s in Cambridge